Gerardo Villanueva Albarrán (born 18 September 1972) is a Mexican politician affiliated with the National Regeneration Movement (formerly to the Citizens' Movement). As of 2013 he served as Deputy of both the LX and LXII Legislatures of the Mexican Congress representing the Federal District.

References

1972 births
Living people
People from Mexico City
Citizens' Movement (Mexico) politicians
Morena (political party) politicians
21st-century Mexican politicians
Deputies of the LXII Legislature of Mexico
Members of the Chamber of Deputies (Mexico) for Mexico City